The Charlotte River is a tributary of the St. Marys River in the state of Michigan in the United States. Via the St. Marys River, it is part of the watershed of Lake Huron. Via Lake Huron and the Great Lakes system, it is part of the larger watershed of the St. Lawrence River.

Course

The river's entire length and watershed are in eastern Chippewa County. It flows for most of its length in Bruce Township, initially northeastward before turning southeastward at the unincorporated locality of Rosedale. Marie, Michigan.

Some maps show the river's course upstream of Rosedale as the South Branch Charlotte River, with the name "Charlotte River" upstream of this point assigned to a southeastward flowing tributary. In the National Hydrography Dataset, this tributary appears only as an unnamed stream. "South Branch Charlotte River" is also listed in the Geographic Names Information System as a variant name.

Near its mouth the river flows through Michigan State University's Dunbar Forest Experiment Station, an off-campus forest management research area.

Watershed characteristics

The Charlotte River watershed consists of two HUC-12 subwatersheds, as defined by the United States Geological Survey:

In addition to Dafter and Bruce townships, the Charlotte River also drains a small portion of Soo Township. The watershed is located in a predominantly rural region, much of which has been drained for agriculture, logging, and development. Soils in the region are primarily poorly drained clays over limestone and dolomite bedrock. Runoff from artesian wells contributes to the turbidity that is typical of the region's streams.

According to a 2012 report prepared for the United States Environmental Protection Agency and the Michigan Department of Environmental Quality, the watershed had an estimated population of 3,451 as of the 2010 U.S. Census. There were an estimated 1,562 households, all of which were serviced by onsite sanitary disposal systems. Land use in the Charlotte River watershed was reported as follows:

See also
Parker Road–Charlotte River Bridge
List of rivers of Michigan

Notes

References

Rivers of Michigan
Rivers of Chippewa County, Michigan
Tributaries of Lake Huron